The Léo-Pariseau Prize is a Québécois prize which is awarded annually to a distinguished individual working in the field of biological or health sciences. The prize is awarded by the Association francophone pour le savoir (Acfas), and is named after Léo Pariseau, the first president of Acfas. 

The award was inaugurated in 1944 and was the first Acfas prize. Prior to 1980 the prize was awarded to researchers in a large variety of disciplines, before being restricted to biological and health sciences. There are now ten annual prizes for researchers in different disciplines.

Winners
Source: Acfas – Prix de la Recherche Scientifique de l'Acfas – Prix Léo-Pariseau
1944 - Marie-Victorin Kirouac, botany, Université de Montréal
1945 - Paul-Antoine Giguère, chemistry, Université Laval
1946 - Marius Barbeau, ethnology, Université Laval
1947 - Jacques Rousseau, botany and ethnology, Université de Montréal
1948 - Léo Marion, chemistry, University of Ottawa
1949 - Jean Bruchési, history and political science, Université de Montréal
1950 - Louis-Charles Simard, pathology, Université de Montréal
1951 - Cyrias Ouellet, chemistry, Université Laval
1952 - Louis-Paul Dugal, physiology, Université de Montréal
1953 - Guy Frégault, history, Université de Montréal
1954 - Pierre Demers. physics, Université de Montréal
1955 - René Pomerleau, mycology, Université de Montréal
1956 - Marcel Rioux, anthropology, Université de Montréal
1957 - No prize awarded.
1958 - Roger Gaudry, chemistry, Université de Montréal
1959 - Lionel Daviault, entomology 
1960 - Marcel Trudel, history, Université Laval  
1961 - Raymond Lemieux, chemistry, University of Alberta
1962 - Charles-Philippe Leblond, histology, McGill University
1963 - Lionel Groulx, history, Université de Montréal
1964 - Larkin Kerwin, physics, Université Laval
1965 - Pierre Dansereau, ecology, Université du Québec à Montréal
1966 - Noël Mailloux, psychology, Université de Montréal
1967 - Albéric Boivin, physics, Université Laval
1968 - Léonard-Francis Bélanger, histology, Université de Montréal
1969 - Fernand Dumont, sociology, Université Laval
1970 - Bernard Belleau, biochemistry, Bristol-Myers of Canada
1971 - Édouard Pagé, biology, Université de Montréal
1972 - Louis-Edmond Hamelin, geography, Université Laval
1973 - Camille Sandorfy, chemistry, Université de Montréal
1974 - Antoine D'Iorio, biochemistry, Université d'Ottawa
1975 - Pierre Angersphilosophy, Université de Montréal
1976 - Paul Marmet, physics, Université Laval
1977 - Jacques de Repentigny, microbiology and immunology, Université de Montréal
1978 - Vincent Lemieux, political science, Université Laval
1979 - Pierre Deslongchamps, chemistry, Université de Sherbrooke
1980 - André Barbeau, neurology, Institut de recherches cliniques de Montréal
1981 - Jean-G. Lafontaine, biology, Université Laval
1982 - J.-André Fortin, botany, Université Laval
1983 - Germain Brisson, nutrition, Université Laval
1984 - Wladimir A. Smirnoff, microbiology, Environment Canada
1985 - Louis Legendre, biology, Université Laval
1986 - Marc Cantin, medicine, Université de Montréal
1987 - Guy Lemieux, nephrology, Université de Montréal
1988 - Pierre Borgeat, physiology, Université Laval
1989 - Jules Hardy, neurosurgery, Université de Montréal
1990 - Jacques de Champlain, medicine, Université de Montréal
1991 - Jacques Leblanc, medicine, Université Laval
1992 - Paul Jolicoeur, molecular biology, Institut de recherches cliniques de Montréal
1993 - Albert J. Aguayo, neurology, McGill University
1994 - Emil Skamene, medicine, McGill University
1995 - André Parent, physiology, Université Laval
1996 - Domineco Regoli, pharmacology, Université de Sherbrooke
1997 - Rémi Quirion, neurosciences, McGill University
1998 - Serge Rossignol, neurosciences, Université de Montréal
1999 - Guy Armand Rouleau, neurology, McGill University
2000 - Rima Rozen, human genetics and pediatrics, McGill University
2001 - Nabil G. Seidah, biochemistry and molecular medicine, Institut de recherches cliniques de Montréal
2002 - Graham Bell. biology, McGill University
2003 - Mona Nemer, pharmacology, Université de Montréal
2004 - Jacques Montplaisir, sleep sciences, Université de Montréal
2005 - Laurent Descarries, pathology and cell biology, Université de Montréal
2006 - Michel Bouvier, biochemistry, Université de Montréal
2007 - André Veillette, immunology, Université de Montréal
2008 - Michael Kramer, pediatrics, Université McGill
2009 - Michel J. Tremblay, medical biology, Université Laval
2010 - René Roy, medicinal chemistry, Université du Québec à Montréal
2011 - Claude Perreault, immunology, Université de Montréal
2012 - Julien Doyon, neurosciences, Université de Montréal
2013 - Jean-Pierre Julien, neurodegeneration, Université Laval
2014 - Marc-André Sirard, animal reproduction, Université Laval
2015 - Guy Sauvageau, immunology and oncology, Université de Montréal
2016 - Gustavo Turecki, suicide and neurosciences, McGill University
2017 - Jacques Simard, genetics, Université Laval
2018 - Sylvain Moineau, microbiology, Université Laval
2019 - Sylvain Chemtob, neonatalogy and pharmacology, Université de Montréal

See also

 List of biology awards
 List of medicine awards

References

Canadian science and technology awards
Awards established in 1944
Medicine awards